Vincent MacDowell (1925–2003) was an Irish political activist.  He was the vice chairman of Northern Ireland Civil Rights Association in the 1960s, and later a representative of the Green Party and the Irish Labour Party.

Born in Newry, County Down, MacDowell was interned for IRA membership in the 1940s.  He was a member of the Socialist Republican Party in Belfast, where he edited the party's newspaper the Northern Star. MacDowell advocated the Irish Labour Party re-organising in Northern Ireland, and supported the party in elections in the late 1940s and early 1950s in Belfast.

He was elected as a Green Party councilor in Dún Laoghaire in 1999, after previously standing as an Independent and Labour party member.

References

People from Newry
1925 births
2003 deaths
Green Party (Ireland) politicians
Irish Republican Army (1922–1969) members
Labour Party (Ireland) politicians